The International Journal of Technoethics is a biannual peer-reviewed academic journal covering ethics as it relates to science, technology, and engineering. It was established in 2010 and is published by IGI Global. The editor-in-chief is Steven Umbrello (Institute for Ethics and Emerging Technologies).

The journal is indexed by DBLP.

References

External links

Publications established in 2010
Ethics journals
Technoethics, International Journal of
Biannual journals
Ethics of science and technology